José Navas is a contemporary choreographer and dancer born in Venezuela in 1965, and based in Montreal, Quebec.

Biography 
José Navas began his training at the Taller de Danza in Caracas before moving to New York and studying at the Merce Cunningham Studio. There, he collaborated with Stephen Petronio, Michael Clark, Lucinda Childs and various other independent choreographers. In 1991 he moved to Canada and began to choreograph. He founded Compagnie Flak in 1995.

José Navas was first known for his talents as a soloist on the European and North American stages. He quickly established himself as a choreographer proposing bold and unusual works. In 1998, he established his reputation in Canada with One Night Only 3/3, a daring and provocative trio. Crowned "Best young foreign choreographer" by the German magazine Ballet Tanz Aktuell International in 1999, he appeared the following year among the "100 people who move Quebec" in the French magazine L'Express.

José Navas is the recipient of several awards. Among others, he shares a Bessie Award with choreographer William Douglas for the solo While Waiting and won the award for "Best Choreography for the Camera" at the Moving Picture Festival in Toronto for the celebrated art film Lodela, directed by Philippe Baylaucq.

In 2009, he had already created over thirty works for the stage and screen and his company had toured in over 20 countries. Since 2004, he has focused his artistic research on the essence and purity of movement. Abstraction, simplicity, intensity and depth are the words that best describe his current work.

Choreographies 
 2008: S
 2008: Miniatures (solos)
 2006: Anatomies
 2006: Límpido Amor (solo on pointe for Anik Bissonnette – Montréal)
 2006: Calm Abiding (solo for Nova Bhattacharya – Toronto)
 2005: Portable Dances
 2004: Le Ciel, brûlant des heures (duet for the company Montréal Danse – Montréal )
 2001: Solo with Cello (solo originally entitled Haman/Navas Project)
 2003: Adela, mi amor<ref> Dfdanse, [http://www.dfdanse.com/article425.html Adela, mi amor de José Navas (...) Sous le signe de l’onirisme], Montréal, 2004</ref>
 2000: Perfume de Gardenias 1999: Côté cœur, côté jardin (solo for company Danse-Cité – Montréal)
 1998: One Night Only 3/3 1998: Abstraction (solo)
 1998: Enter: Last (group piece for the company Montréal Danse – Montréal)
 1997: Bosquejo (solo for the Springdance Festival – Utrecht)
 1997: One Night Only 2/3 (group piece for the company Benoît Lachambre / by b.l.eux)
 1997: One Night Only 1/3 (solo for Princess Productions – Toronto)
 1996: Sterile Fields (solo)
 1996: Luna Llena 1996: Deep Down 1994: Postdata (solo solo performed by José Navas, commissioned by Culturgest – Lisbon)
 1992: Flak 1992: Celestiales 1991: When We Dreamed the Other Heaven Performances as a dancer, other than for Compagnie Flak 
 1997: Sonata and... (Bill T. Jones) 		
 1995: While waiting (William Douglas)

 Cinema and theatre 
 2005: Choreographer for Adéla (Jocelyn Barnabé)
 2002: Choreographer and dancer in Perpetual Motion (Laura Taler)
 2002: Director of Les Fleuves profonds (José María Arguedas, adaptation: Wajdi Mouawad)
 1997: Choreographer and dancer in The Golden City (Moze Mossanen)
 1996: Dancer in The Village Trilogy (Laura Taler)
 1995: Choreographer and dancer in Lodela (Philip Baylaucq)
 2011: Choreographer for  Ora'' (Philip Baylaucq)

Notes and references 

1965 births
Living people
Canadian contemporary dancers
Canadian choreographers
Contemporary dance choreographers
Film choreographers